General elections were held in Ghana on 7 December 1996. In the presidential election, incumbent Jerry Rawlings of the National Democratic Congress (NDC) was reelected in a single round, defeating John Kufuor of the Great Alliance (led by Kufuor's New Patriotic Party with 57.3 percent of the vote. The NDC retained its majority in Parliament, winning 133 of the 200 seats.

Results

President

Parliament

See also
List of Ghana Parliament constituencies
List of MPs elected in the 1996 Ghanaian parliamentary election

References

External links
1996 Parliamentary Election Results, Electoral Commission of Ghana, Archived from original on 17 Juy 2011
Ghana Centre for Democratic Development

Elections in Ghana
Ghana
1996 in Ghana
Presidential elections in Ghana
Election and referendum articles with incomplete results